Kurt Peters (10 August 1915 – 2 February 1996) was a German dancer, dance educator, dance critic, dance historian and publisher. In 1948, he founded the Deutsches Tanzarchiv Köln.

Life 
Born in Hamburg, Peters received his professional training in the school for classical dance by Mariska Rudolph, Hamburg (former ballet master at the Deutsches Schauspielhaus), Hungarian Court Opera Budapest, in the opera ballet school of Alexandra Fedorowna-Fokine (Opera Nationale Riga; formerly: Imperial Theatre of Petersburg), in the Laban school in Hamburg (director: Albrecht Knust) and in the school for acrobatics and tap dance of Donald Winclair (USA/Hamburg). 

He was a dancer at the Hamburg State Opera (then City Theatre) and in Aachen; solo dancer and assistant ballet master in Saarbrücken; training master and choreographer of travelling variété stages (for dance artistry and classical dance); training master in step and acrobatics for members of the Copenhagen Pantomime Theatre.

Military service from 1939 to 1945 (as a lance corporal) with a shot in the stomach, foot injuries and imprisonment ended his career as a theatre dancer. From 1946, he was a teacher in Hamburg, from 1965 to 1979 a lecturer and co-director, later director of the Cologne Institute for Stage Dance of the Hochschule für Musik und Tanz Köln and Rheinische Musikschule, where he also taught Kinetographie Laban and expanded the Pedagogical Seminar. In 1953, he founded the journal "Das Tanzarchiv" (in 1981 united with "Ballett Journal", since 2003 merged with "tanzdrama" in "Tanz-Journal"). He was married to Gisela Peters-Rohse from 1967.

Awards 
  I. classe der GDR, 1957 (as a citizen of Germany)
 Deutscher Tanzpreis 1984
 Order of Merit of the Federal Republic of Germany 1987

Publications 
Main publication:
 Kurt Peters: Lexikon der klassischen Tanztechnik. Eine systematische Terminologie der klassischen Tanzkunst. Hamburg 1961. 2nd edition. Wilhelmshaven 1991

Other monographic works:
 Abraxas. Hamburg 1964
 Lola Rogge -  eine Insel der musischen Tanzkultur. Hamburg 1964
 Dore Hoyer Hamburg 1964
 Kinetographisches Lexikon der klassischen Tanztechnik. Hamburg 1965
 Ballett – Königliche Spiele in Herrenhausen. Cologne 1966
 10 Jahre Internationale Sommerakademie des Tanzes. Cologne 1966
 Ballet at the Hessian State Theatre Wiesbaden. Cologne 1968
 Enchainements of classical dance in kinetograms. Cologne 1968
 Kurt Peters et al.: Dance History. In four concise compendia. Wilhelmshaven 1991

Peters has written hundreds of articles in professional journals (including as a correspondent for the Dancing Times), daily newspapers and other professional publications.

References

Further reading 
 Horst Koegler, Helmut Günther: Reclams Ballett Lexikon. Reclam, Stuttgart 1984, . 
 Festschrift Deutscher Tanzpreis. Vol. 1984. Kurt Peters. Published by the Deutschen Berufsverband für Tanzpädagogik. Essen 1984.
 Otto Schneider, Riki Raab (Mit.): Tanz Lexikon. Schott, Mainz/London/New York/Tokyo 1985, .

External links 
 Frank-Manuel Peter: Nachruf auf Kurt Peters
 Horst Koegler: Zum 10. Todestag von Kurt Peters

German dancers
Dance teachers
Dance critics
Academic staff of the Hochschule für Musik und Tanz Köln
20th-century German educators
20th-century publishers (people)
Recipients of the Cross of the Order of Merit of the Federal Republic of Germany
1915 births
1996 deaths
People from Hamburg